Kvam is a village in Steinkjer municipality in Trøndelag county, Norway. The small village of Kvam lies directly on the lake shore and it has a school, store, senior living center, and Kvam Church. Farther north from the lake includes a wilderness area including the large lakes Gilten and Bangsjøan. The village was the administrative centre of the old municipality of Kvam which existed from 1909 until its dissolution in 1964.

References

Villages in Trøndelag
Steinkjer